Aleksandr Yevgenyevich Klimenko (born 13 May 1968) is a Turkmen former professional footballer and who is currently the football manager of the Şagadam FK. Honoured Coach of Turkmenistan.

Career 
Aleksandr Klimenko spent his entire professional career in Turkmenistan, where he played for FC Merw, FC Nisa, Şagadam FK and Nisa Aşgabat. He ended his football career in 2006.

Coaching career 
In 2007, he was an assistant coach at the FC Ashgabat.

In 2011–2012, he was a coach of the Nebitçi FT.

In 2014, he worked as an assistant coach in the Turkmenistan national football team, in June he was relieved of his post.

In 2015, he worked as an assistant to head coach Rahym Kurbanmämmedow at the FC Energetik.

Since 2016 he is the head coach of the Nebitçi FT.

References 

Living people
Sportspeople from Ashgabat
Turkmenistan footballers
FC Nisa Aşgabat players
FK Köpetdag Aşgabat players
FC Aşgabat players
Turkmenistan football managers
1968 births
Turkmenistan international footballers
Association football goalkeepers